Melbourne Youth Justice Centre (formerly Melbourne Juvenile Justice Centre and Turana Youth Training Centre) is a youth corrections facility located in Parkville, Victoria, Australia.

The facility is designed to accommodate 15- to 17-year-old males through four units and a separate multi-purpose unit that houses remand prisoners. Some inmates are slightly older if they were under 18 at the time of their offence.
Prisoners have access to a variety of social, vocational and educational programs, as well as day and weekend leaves. Prisoners also have TVs in their rooms. The facility is one of Australia's most hazardous workplaces.

History
Until the mid-1950s, Turana (then the Children's Welfare Department Receiving Depot for Girls and Boys) "processed" all children from infancy to 18 coming into the care of the State Government, whether offenders or under the then equivalent of care and protection orders. Children were sent from Turana to various institutions (government and non-government) throughout the state. Children who were deemed "difficult" to handle or who required psychiatric treatment or were due for court appearances in Melbourne were returned to Turana.

The opening of Winlaton Youth Training Centre (also known as Winlaton Juvenile School and Nunawading Residential Facility) in 1956 meant that young women aged 14–18 were moved out of Turana. The opening in 1960 of Pirra Children's Home (aka Pirra Girls' Home) and Allambie Reception Centre meant that young children under the care of the Family Welfare Division of the Social Welfare Department, were also moved out of Turana which could then accommodate young males only.

The name "Turana" was chosen in the late 1950s by the wife of Arthur Rylah, then Chief Secretary of Victoria. The word was believed to be Koori for "Rainbow". Ilya Nikkolai designed and remodelled the Turana Youth Remand and Classification Centre, introducing laminated tempered glass in galvanised high-tensile steel frames, solving long-standing security and maintenance problems.

References

 Juvenile Justice Centres

Prisons in Melbourne
Juvenile detention centres in Australia
Buildings and structures in the City of Melbourne (LGA)
1993 establishments in Australia
Government buildings completed in 1993